James Louis Bimpson (14 May 1929 – 13 November 2021) was an English footballer who played as a striker for Liverpool during the 1950s. He notched up a good goalscoring record without ever being a first-team regular.

Life and playing career
Born in Rainford, Lancashire (now in Merseyside) in May 1929, Bimpson played for Burscough before Liverpool signed him in 1953. He made his debut two months later on 7 March in a league match at Villa Park. It was a day not to remember, however, as Aston Villa cruised to a convincing 4–0 victory over a struggling Reds side. His first goal came a month later on 3 April, again, in a league match, but this time at Anfield in a 2–1 victory over Cardiff City Bimpson's 19th-minute strike turned out to be the winner.

Bimpson signed for the Reds just as the side was about to hit hard times, including being relegated to 2nd Division at the end of Bimpson's first full season at Anfield. Despite the team difficulties, Louis averaged a goal every other game, netting 12 in 24 appearances, including scoring twice in a 4–4 draw with rivals Manchester United at Anfield on 22 August, and netting four goals in a 4–0 home win against Burnley on 19 September 1953.

The inside-right, who was just as comfortable as a centre-forward, didn't make that much of an impact in Liverpool's first season in the lower tier, playing just nine games and scoring two goals. The 1956–57 season was a better one for Bimpson, appearing in 21 games although he only managed six goals.

The following campaign was another average one, but the 1958–59 campaign was the best season Louis had in the red of Liverpool. He started 16 games, netting a respectable 11 goals. Unfortunately, this was to be his last full season at Anfield. The following year, Dave Hickson made the short journey across Stanley Park, from Merseyside rivals Everton, which reduced Bimpson's playing time. He struggled to hold down a regular spot, and only started five times. On 19 November 1959 he was allowed to leave and joined Blackburn Rovers.

Bimpson is probably best remembered for his time at Ewood Park, especially his first season as he scored in a 4–1 victory over Sunderland in the 1959–60 FA Cup third round replay, and followed that with a brace in an impressive 3–1 win at Tottenham Hotspur in round five. Rovers made it to the cup final that year with Bimpson in the side but they played well below their best on that day, as well as being reduced to ten men through injury, and lost 0–3 to Wolverhampton Wanderers.

Bimpson went on to play for Bournemouth & Boscombe Athletic and Rochdale before dropping into non-league football with Wigan Athletic in 1963, where he scored twice in five Cheshire League games. He finished his career back at his first club Burscough as an amateur.

Bimpson died on 13 November 2021, at the age of 92.

Honours
Blackburn Rovers
 FA Cup: runner-up 1959–60

References

External links
Player profile at LFChistory.net

1929 births
2021 deaths
English footballers
Association football forwards
Liverpool F.C. players
Blackburn Rovers F.C. players
AFC Bournemouth players
Rochdale A.F.C. players
Wigan Athletic F.C. players
FA Cup Final players
People from Rainford